The Oryol electoral district was a constituency created for the 1917 Russian Constituent Assembly election.

The electoral district covered the Oryol Governorate. The Kraiskovo electoral commission chair was killed by soldiers at the time of the election.

Results

References

Electoral districts of the Russian Constituent Assembly election, 1917